Susan Clough (born 1945) was the personal executive secretary to President Jimmy Carter. She also worked for him prior to his presidency.

Prior to secretarial work
About 12 years before serving Carter, Clough was looking for a job while raising her two children, Doug and Carol. At that time, she was trying to manage life after getting divorced from her husband, who she had married at the age of 16. After studying for one year at Fresno City College, she found herself with no marketable skills. She was receiving only $200 per month from her ex-husband, and struggled financially. However, Clough was ambitious and intelligent. She was a Mensa member, and could play piano and classical guitar, make clothes, and was an avid reader of nonfiction. She also enjoyed playing competitive games.

As secretary
After completing a secretarial course, she found a job at Fort Bragg, N.C. Her ex-husband had been stationed there, and her father was a retired Army colonel. She quit her job there partially "because all my bosses were propositioning me." She then moved to Atlanta and became a legal secretary.

Work for Carter
In 1971 she became a member of Carter's staff, and took the position of assistant to the press chief Jody Powell. She then began to work as Carter's personal secretary while he was Governor of Georgia.  Her job included such duties as research and drafting speeches. It was during that time that she developed a friendship with Carter. When he left office at the end of his term in 1975, Clough remained to serve Carter's successor, George Busbee. Eighteenth months later, Carter telephoned her, and asked her to return to work for him. She did, and eventually became the personal assistant and secretary to the President. Her duties included drafting much of his correspondence. She received a salary of more than $30,000 per year.

Personal life
Clough's younger brother was shot and killed during a spree of random murders around Atlanta.

References

1945 births
Carter administration personnel
Fresno City College alumni
Living people
Mensans
Personal secretaries to the President of the United States